The 2023 Argentina Open was a men's tennis tournament played on outdoor clay courts. It was the 26th edition of the ATP Buenos Aires event, and part of the ATP Tour 250 series of the 2023 ATP Tour. It took place in Buenos Aires, Argentina, from 13 to 19 February 2023.

Finals

Singles 

  Carlos Alcaraz def.  Cameron Norrie, 6–3, 7–5
 It was Alcaraz's 1st title of the year and the 7th of his career.

Doubles 

  Simone Bolelli /  Fabio Fognini def.  Nicolás Barrientos /  Ariel Behar, 6–2, 6–4

Points and prize money

Point distribution

Prize money 

*per team

Singles main draw entrants

Seeds

1 Rankings are as of 6 February 2023.

Other entrants 
The following players received wildcards into the singles main draw:
  Facundo Díaz Acosta 
  Guido Pella 
  Dominic Thiem 

The following player received entry using a protected ranking into the singles main draw:
  Hugo Dellien

The following players received entry from the qualifying draw:
  Yannick Hanfmann 
  Dušan Lajović
  Camilo Ugo Carabelli 
  Juan Pablo Varillas

Withdrawals 
  Corentin Moutet → replaced by  Thiago Monteiro

Doubles main draw entrants

Seeds 

1 Rankings as of 6 February 2023.

Other entrants 
The following pairs received wildcards into the doubles main draw:
  Federico Coria /  Tomás Martín Etcheverry
  Diego Schwartzman /  Dominic Thiem

Withdrawals 
  Federico Coria /  Tomás Martín Etcheverry → replaced by  Boris Arias /  Federico Zeballos
  Marcel Granollers /  Horacio Zeballos

References

External links 

 

Argentina Open
Argentina Open
ATP Buenos Aires
Argentina Open